The Andorran Federation of Ice Sports (FAEG) is the governing body of ice hockey, curling, and figure skating in Andorra.

Ice hockey statistics
 52 players total
 17 male players
 24 junior players
 11 female players
 No referees
 1 indoor rink
 Not ranked in the world ranking

References

External links
 Andorra – IIHF.com
  Web oficial de la Federació Andorrana d'Esports de Gel

1995 establishments in Andorra
Ice hockey governing bodies in Europe
Federation
International Ice Hockey Federation members
Ice hockey
Sports organizations established in 1995
National governing bodies for ice skating